Mojtaba Samareh Hashemi is an Iranian politician. He was a "senior adviser" to Iranian president Mahmoud Ahmadinejad and deputy interior minister for political affairs.  He is said to have "strong ties to the Revolutionary Guard Corps and to the intelligence services" and to be "a constant presence at the president's side, in every cabinet meeting and during midday prayers at the office..." and acting "more as a cross between Iran's Karl Rove and a [American] president's chief of staff."

He studied with Ahmadinejad at the Iran University of Science and Technology in the late 1970s, and like Ahmadinejad, he is a dedicated student of "ultra-conservative" cleric Mohammad-Taqi Mesbah-Yazdi. Later on, thanks to their friendship, Ahmadinejad received his first official job, as the mayor of Maku and Khoy, near the border with Turkey. Reportedly, Samareh's connections with the Basij enabled Ahmadinejad to establish relations with that group and with the Revolutionary Guard Corps.

Prior to his role as adviser he was sponsored by Mohammad-Taqi Mesbah-Yazdi for, and quickly appointed to, a critical job, director of placements, at the Foreign Ministry of Iran, in the early 1990s. In September 2006 he flew to Paris to deliver a private message to President Jacques Chirac from president Ahmadinejad. Very shortly afterward, he was appointed deputy interior minister for political affairs, (though he continued his full-time duties as senior adviser). In October 2006 he was "appointed head of the election commission, supervisor of the poll for the Assembly of Experts." Despite his close association with Mesbah-Yazdi, that cleric did not do well in the election and only came in sixth-place finish in the Tehran municipality, "barely squeezing into his seat in the Assembly". Samareh Hashemi resigning from the election commission a "few months later in the summer of 2007."

References

Living people
Iranian Vice Ministers
Iran University of Science and Technology alumni
Presidential advisers of Iran
Alliance of Builders of Islamic Iran politicians
People from Kerman Province
Year of birth missing (living people)
Iranian campaign managers